Ahar (Ahar Mahadev) is a village situated in the Anupshahr Tehsil of the Bulandshahr district in Uttar Pradesh, India. It is located 11.98 kilometres from the Mandal headquarters in Anupshahr and is 39.09 kilometres from the district headquarters in Bulandshahar.

Villages nearby include Mohammadpur Bangar (2.4 km), Bamanpur (2.9 km), Aurangabad Tahapur Bager (3.5 km), Mauharsa (3.6 km), Daravar (4.0 km), Hasanpur Bangar (4.1 km), and Pachdevra (4.7 km). Ahar is located on the banks of the Ganges and is known for its temples dedicated to Shiva and Avantika.

History 
The history of Bulandshahar (Ahar Mahadev) begins even before 1200 B.C. This region is nearer to the capital of Pandavas - Indraprasth and Hastinapur. With passes of time the king Parma made a fort on this part of region and a king named Ahibaran laid the foundation of a tower called Baran (Bulandshahr). Since it was perched on a highland it came to be known as high city which was translated into passion language as Bulandshahr.

See also 
Ahar-Banas culture

References 

Villages in Bulandshahr district